John Almond (born 6 November 1876) was an English footballer who played as a forward. Born in Darlington, County Durham, he spent the majority of his career in and around the Yorkshire area with spells at Leeds City, Bradford City, Doncaster Rovers and Sheffield United where he played over 100 games, winning the First Division championship in 1898 and gaining an FA Cup winners medal having scored in the 1899 final.

Playing career
Almond started his career playing in his local area and soon came to prominence whilst at Darlington, leading him to be signed by Sheffield United. Whilst in Yorkshire Almond was initially a regular in the side, with his goals helping The Blades to be crowned English champions in 1898 and win the FA Cup in 1899, having scored United's third goal in the final. However a loss of form led to him losing his first team place and he was overlooked when United reached the FA Cup final again in 1901.

Disappointed to be frozen out of the team Almond quit the club and professional football to take over a pub in Gainford near his home town of Darlington.  After a few months as a publican and playing for the local amateur side he returned to senior football signing for Millwall Athletic before returning to Yorkshire for spells at Leeds City, Bradford City and Doncaster Rovers. He later turned out for Doncaster GNER.

Personal life
Almond was the son of a wealthy Yorkshire brewer and was reported to have inherited between £6,000 and £12,000 when his father died in 1897 - a huge sum of money for the time.   After he finished playing it was reported that he was working in the Doncaster locomotive works in 1910 but there is little evidence of what happened to him after that. It was initially reported that he had died in Liverpool in 1912 but there were two reports in the Sheffield press of him attending a game in Leeds in 1931, stating that he was the assistant manager of the Griffin Hotel in the city and was set to move to run a hotel in Bangor.

Career statistics

Honours
Sheffield United
Division One
Champions: 1898
Runners-up: 1900
FA Cup 
Winner: 1899
Sheriff of London Charity Shield 
Winner (shared): 1898

References

1876 births
Year of death missing
Footballers from Darlington
English footballers
English Football League players
Association football forwards
Bishop Auckland F.C. players
Darlington F.C. players
Sheffield United F.C. players
Millwall F.C. players
Leeds City F.C. players
Bradford City A.F.C. players
Doncaster Rovers F.C. players
Midland Football League players
FA Cup Final players